Aerocaribe Flight 7831 was a British Aerospace Jetstream 32EP, registration N912FJ, with 17 passengers and 2 crew on a intra-Mexican short haul flight from Terán Airport in Tuxtla Gutiérrez, Chiapas, to Carlos Rovirosa Pérez International Airport in Villahermosa, Tabasco. On 8 July 2000, Flight 7831 departed Téran at approximately 19:30. Subsequently, it encountered severe weather, which the captain requested permission from air traffic control (ATC) at Tuxtla Gutiérrez to fly around.

ATC granted the request, and the flight turned to the right, but at 19:50 Flight 7831 crashed in a mountainous area while descending, bursting into flames on impact near Chulum Juarez, Chiapas. All 19 passengers and crew on board died.

See also 
2000 East Coast Aviation Services British Aerospace Jetstream crash

References

External links 


 Ionides, Nicholas. "Aerocaribe Jetstream 32 crash kills 19." Flight International. 10 July 2000.
 "Se estrella avion comercial en Chiapas; hay 19 muertos" (Archive). El Universal. Monday 10 July 2000.

Aviation accidents and incidents in 2000
Aviation accidents and incidents in Mexico
Airliner accidents and incidents involving controlled flight into terrain
Accidents and incidents involving the British Aerospace Jetstream
Mexicana de Aviación
July 2000 events in Mexico
2000 in Mexico